Panchamirtham is 2008 Tamil-language fantasy comedy film scripted and directed by Raju Eswaran, it stars Jayaram, Prakash Raj and the director himself alongside an ensemble supporting cast including Nassar, Aravind Akash, Regina Cassandra, Saranya Mohan, Samiksha, Karunas, and Ganja Karuppu. Produced by Abhirami Ramanatha and with music by Sundar C Babu, the film released on Christmas (25 December) 2008.

Plot
The story begins at Ravanan's (Prakash Raj) abode and the time of Ramayana when he orders his uncle Mareesan (Jayaram) to transform into a deer to abduct Seetha (Regina Cassandra). Mareesan argues with Ravana but finally complies since Idumba (Raju Eswaran) and Ravana threaten the life of Mareesan's lover Mandahini (Samiksha). Finally, the said thing happens, and Mareesan gets struck by the arrow by lord Rama. He becomes a rock, but not before he transforms Idumba into an anklet and wears it on his leg. Times change, and the modern day comes. Rajaram (Nassar) is a very rich man who owns tea estates. He has Seetha (Saranya Mohan) as his dietitian and Sri Rama (Aravind Akash) as his cook. Both Rama and Seetha are in love. On the other hand, Rajaram's relatives (Thirupathi (M. S. Bhaskar) and Mayilsamy) plan a plot to take the property. In this process, they end up planning to kill Seetha by pushing her from a mountaintop. Seetha falls directly on the rock idol of Mareesan and gets his human form. At the same time, his anklet falls off and gets eaten by a fish. That fish is caught by fisherman Manickam (Nassar), and Idumba gets his human form. The age old enmity crops up, and while Mareesan vows to protect Seetha, Idumba plans to help Manickam get Rajaram's property as half brother. What happens from there forms the rest of the story..

Cast

 Jayaram as Mareesan
 Prakash Raj as Ravanan
 Raju Eswaran as Idumban
 Nassar as Rajaram and Manickam (dual role)
 Aravind Akash as Sriram
 Saranya Mohan as Seetha
 Samiksha as Mandahini
 Karunas as Pandi
 Ganja Karuppu as Muthu
 M. S. Bhaskar as Thirupathi
 Mayilsamy as Rajaram's relative
 Ilavarasu as Kasi
 Manobala as Doctor
 Lollu Sabha Soundarya as Pappi
 Gowthami Vembunathan as Thirupathi's wife

Production
Abirami Ramanathan, well-known theatre owner and Managing Director of Abirami Mega Mall, forayed into film production with Panchamirtham. The film's inaugural function was held on 13 July 2008. Director, K. Balachander, KRG, Kalaipuli S Dhanu, Kalaipuli Sekaran, Sarath Kumar, Radha Ravi and Rama Narayanan inaugurated the function, A song sequence with Nasser was filmed during the pooja. Earlier Vivek and Vadivelu was said to be the part of this film but proved untrue. A song featuring Saranya Mohan was shot in Ooty and actress-cum-dance master Gayathri Raghuram choreographed it.

Soundtrack
The soundtrack was composed by Sundar C. Babu, and lyrics for all songs were written by Vaali.

"Panchamirtham"— M. S. Viswanathan
"Thandana Thandana" — Shreya Ghoshal
"Nadhikkarai Oram" — Madhu Balakrishnan, K. S. Chithra
"Kadhal Vandhal" — Karthik, Rita
"Uchathula Aandavan" — Naveen Madhav

Critical reception
Nowrunning wrote: "With so many comedians, this film is a slapstick comedy. With children as its target audience, the film entertains". Indiaglitz wrote: "Panchamirtham is a laugh-riot". Rediff wrote: "Even if it isn't as funny or classy as they had promised, the team does deliver some laughs". Kollywood today wrote: "Panchamirtham is a fantastic treat. But unfortunately, there are whole lot of traces of TV serial and Raju Eeswaran with his knack tactics could’ve dealt with this". Behindwoods wrote: "worth a watch".

References

2008 films
2000s Tamil-language films
Indian fantasy comedy films
2000s fantasy comedy films
Films scored by Sundar C. Babu
2008 directorial debut films
2008 comedy films